Scurrula is a genus of parasitic shrubs in the family Loranthaceae, native to south-east Asia.

Species
The Catalogue of Life lists the following species:
 Scurrula aphodastrica
 Scurrula argentea
 Scurrula atropurpurea
 Scurrula buddleioides
 Scurrula chingii
 Scurrula cordifolia
 Scurrula corynitis
 Scurrula didyma
 Scurrula elata
 Scurrula ferruginea
 Scurrula gongshanensis
 Scurrula lepidota
 Scurrula meeboldii
 Scurrula montana
 Scurrula notothixoides
 Scurrula oortiana
 Scurrula parasitica
 Scurrula phoebe-formosanae
 Scurrula pulverulenta
 Scurrula rhopalocarpa
 Scurrula robertsonii
 Scurrula rugulosa
 Scurrula stocksii
 Scurrula tsaii
 Scurrula turbinata

References

Loranthaceae
Loranthaceae genera